Moll/Mole/Molly is a slang term with two different meanings in two places:
In the United States, an archaic term for a gangster's girlfriend. See gun moll.
In Australia and New Zealand, usually pejorative or self-deprecating, for a woman of loose sexual morals, or a prostitute. 
In Western Australia, circa 1970-1990s and less commonly after, Mole can be both an insult or friendly term of endearment for women.  A Mole used as an insult describes an unlikeable female who is annoying.

For the American sense, see gun moll. The remainder of this article describes the Australian sense.

Etymology and spelling
"Moll" derives from "Molly", used as a euphemism for "whore" or "prostitute". The Oxford English Dictionary lists the earliest usage in a 1604 quote by Thomas Middleton: "None of these common Molls neither, but discontented and unfortunate gentlewomen." The existence of the popular derivative spelling, mole, likely reflects the word's history as a spoken, rather than written, insult. Popular usage of this spelling can be seen in the name of The Comedy Company character Kylie Mole. Another example can be seen in a poem by Kevin Munro: "'That Dee will have our jobs; she's a fair dinkum mole!'". The author suggests that this spelling doesn't carry the underworld connotations of the much older moll variant.

In popular culture
In Your Eyes is a 2014 film (dramedy/romance) about two people, a woman (Zoe Kazan plays Rebecca Porter) and a man (Michael Stahl-David plays Dylan Kershaw) who are spiritually and psychologically connected from a young age then come to realize each other as young adults delving into deep emotional and psychological issues of the heart and mind yet never having met in person. The male star refers to a female bar patron as a "Moll".

Puberty Blues was a 1981 movie based on the autobiographical novel by Kathy Lette and Gabrielle Carey about their experiences of being 13-year-old girls on Sydney's southern beaches. In the novel, movie and television series, girls were referred to as molls, bush pigs, top chicks, glam mags, sceggs, or grommets. The term was again popularised following the 2012 television series Puberty Blues, based on the same novel.

Kylie Mole was a character played by Mary-Anne Fahey on the Australian sketch show The Comedy Company. First appearing in 1989, Kylie's appearance is that of a high school student, and her demeanor is that of the stereotypical bogan (a term actually popularised by the character by labeling anyone she didn't like as one). Kylie uses the term 'moll/mole' in context during the original skit, specifically in reference to her name. 

"Game on, molls!" became a popular catchcry in 2006, after scheming contestant Anna used it on Australian reality television show Big Brother. It spawned a range of novelty products such as T-shirts. The phrase has since been quoted in many Australian reality television programs: 

"Game on, moll!" was said by Jordan Loukas, a contestant on Australia's Next Top Model in 2007 and subsequently became an advertising slogan for the show. 
The catchcry was again used in an advertising promotion for reality series My Kitchen Rules in 2012 and then being displayed during the show being broadcast in 2013 when used by contestant Jake Harrison. 
Emma Dean, the eventual winner of the 2013 season of Masterchef Australia, used it self-referentially to describe the way contestants treated each other - "It's just... game on, moles" - and this quote featured prominently in promotion leading up to the series. 
In 2016, the "Game on, moll!" catchcry was again used by Keira Maguire, a contestant on The Bachelor. Possibly the most unexpected reality TV show contestant to use it was Sue, who randomly and quietly dropped this phrase on Australian Survivor. 
In 2017, "Game on Molls"  was used on reality show My Kitchen Rules ahead of a cooking showdown between Amy and Tyson vs Tim and Kyle. After Amy said "Game on!", Kyle whispered "Game on Molls!" but it was very good natured. It made yet another appearance on The Bachelor, the same year, during a medieval themed group date. 
In 2018, on reality show House Rules, contestant Kristie used "Game on, molls!", in exasperation against opposing teams. Opposing teammate, Dave then called her a moll following unsportsmanlike behaviour. It was uttered by another contestant on The Bachelor, this time mean girl Cat, followed by Queen Fenella on Australian Survivor, who threw in a cheeky "Game On Molls" while talking strategy in the Contenders camp.
In 2020, on reality show Big Brother, contestant Ange is tricked into an alliance before being hoodwinked and almost evicted from the house. She addresses fellow contestants with “No hard feelings for whoever voted for me, it’s a game,”. before pointing at who she suspects.“But game on, molls.”

Contestants on the 2009 reality television show Aussie Ladette to Lady have often been described as molls. In 2016, a contestant on reality television series The Block verbally abused her fellow contestant and life partner, by exclaiming "You’re a f**king moll!".

The slang term has also lent itself to wordplay with homophonous terms, such as by character Kath from Kath & Kim: "Kim loves to make a mountain out of a molehill. And in this case there are two moles, Kylie and Danii Bolton. I know the pair of them. Pieces of works, both of them." Kel, another character on the show, says the following to supporting character, Sandy Freckle, during an argument: "You're not a freckle, you're a mole!"

See also

Moll Flanders
Moll King (disambiguation)

References

Pejorative terms for women
Slang terms for women
Australian English
New Zealand slang